Pieces of Dreams is an album by jazz saxophonist Stanley Turrentine, his first recording for the Fantasy label after associations with Blue Note Records and CTI, featuring performances by Turrentine with an orchestra arranged and conducted by Gene Page. The CD rerelease added three additional tracks.

Reception
The Allmusic review by Scott Yanow awarded the album 2 stars and states "Stanley Turrentine's recording of Michel Legrand's "Pieces of Dreams" is quite memorable and made the song into a standard. There are two versions of that song on this CD reissue, but unfortunately, the other six numbers and the two added alternate takes are all quite commercial... None of the other then-recent material is up to the level of "Pieces of Dreams," making this a disc that can be safely passed by".

Track listing
 "Pieces of Dreams" (Michel Legrand, Alan Bergman, Marilyn Bergman) - 4:37  
 "I Know It's You" (Leon Ware) - 6:25  
 "Deep in Love" (Johannes Brahms) - 4:04  
 "Midnight and You" (Billy Page, Gene Page) - 4:38  
 "Evil" (Stevie Wonder, Yvonne Wright) - 4:11  
 "Blanket on the Beach" (Page, Page) - 4:30  
 "I'm in Love" (Bobby Womack) - 4:01  
 "Pieces of Dreams" [alternate take] (Bergman, Bergman, Legrand) - 5:01 Bonus track on CD  
 "Blanket on the Beach" [alternate take] (Page, Page) - 3:34 Bonus track on CD  
 "I'm in Love" [alternate take] (Womack) - 3:35 Bonus track on CD  
Recorded at Fantasy Studios, Berkeley, CA on May 30 & 31, 1974

Personnel
Stanley Turrentine - tenor saxophone
Gene Page - keyboards, arranger, conductor
Sonny Burke, John Miller - keyboards
Ray Parker Jr., Dean Parks, David T. Walker - guitar
Ron Brown - bass
Ed Moore, Ed Greene - drums 
Joe Clayton - congas
Gary Coleman - percussion
Myrna Matthews, Carolyn Willis, Edna Wright - vocals
Unidentified strings

References

1974 albums
Stanley Turrentine albums
Fantasy Records albums
Albums arranged by Gene Page
Albums recorded at Gold Star Studios